Ian Mayes is a British journalist and editor. He was the first "readers' editor" – a title he invented for the newspaper ombudsman role — of The Guardian, from November 1997 to March 2007, and was president of the international Organization of News Ombudsmen from May 2005 to May 2007, serving as a board member since May 2002 after joining in April 2001.

Background
Ian Mayes' career as a journalist spans six decades and includes many years as features editor of the Northampton Chronicle and Echo, before he joined BBC Radio News in Broadcasting House (1979–87), then became assistant features editor of the short-lived London Daily News.

Mayes began writing for The Guardian as a freelance in 1962, his first piece being a story on the features page (then edited by Brian Redhead) about the return of Laurie Lee to the village of Slad in Gloucestershire, where Cider with Rosie was set. It was towards the end of 1988 that Mayes joined the staff of the newspaper; his first ten years included launching The Guardian Weekend magazine and the daily G2 section with former editor Alan Rusbridger, and time served as deputy features editor, arts editor and obituaries editor.

From November 1997 to March 2007, Mayes was The Guardians Readers' Editor – a title he invented for the newspaper ombudsman role to suggest a bridge between readers and journalists — the first such appointment of a resident independent ombudsman in the UK. Other British newspapers, including The Observer, The Independent on Sunday and the Daily Mirror, quickly followed suit in appointing readers' editors, although Mayes was the only one to do the job full-time. The Guardian system was also closely replicated on newspapers such as Politiken in Denmark and The Hindu in India.

Through an influential weekly column called "Open Door", Mayes dealt with corrections and clarifications (14,000 in his decade in the post), as well as conducting a debate on the ethics of journalism. Selections from the columns were collected in four books: Corrections and Clarifications (2000), Corrections and Clarifications 2002 (2002), Only Correct: The Best of Corrections and Clarifications (2005) and Journalism Right and Wrong: Ethical and Other Issues Raised by Readers in the Guardian's Open Door Column. A translated selection of the columns was produced by Moscow State University under the title Rabota nad oshibkami (Work on mistakes).

He was president of the international Organization of News Ombudsmen (ONO) from May 2005 to May 2007, serving as a board member since May 2002 after joining in April 2001. He has lectured and taken part in seminars on the function of ombudsmen in the media nationally and internationally (including in the US, Russia, Scandinavia, and Slovenia), inspiring newspapers in other parts of the world to create their own readers' editors; typically, The Hindu has referenced "the exemplary practice and experience of The Guardian, whose pioneering RE, Ian Mayes, had set the bar high." He is credited with the discovery of the "apostrofly", "an insect which lands at random on the printed page depositing an apostrophe wherever it alights". His last column as Readers' Editor appeared on 2 April 2007, since when he has been an associate editor of the Guardian.

He has been honoured by the creation of "The Ian Mayes Award for Writing Wrongs" in 2008.

Mayes has been researching and writing over the past decade the third volume of the official history of The Guardian, beginning in 1986, his aim being to "humanise the decisions that have shaped the Guardian and its editorial line".

Hazlitt Society
Mayes was instrumental in the project to restore William Hazlitt's grave, after visiting the original neglected gravestone in St Anne's Churchyard early in 2001. The restored grave was unveiled by Michael Foot on the 225th anniversary of Hazlitt's birth, 10 April 2003. Mayes was closely involved with the subsequent formation of the Hazlitt Society, of which he was inaugural Chairman.

Works

Bibliography
 Samuel De Wilde, c.1751-1832: Theatre in Georgian and Regency London : George James De Wilde, 1804-1871, The life and times of Victorian Northampton: An exhibition at Northampton Central Art Gallery, 4 September to 2 October, 1971 (Northampton Museums and Art Gallery, 1971).
Corrections and Clarifications (Fourth Estate, 2000), and (Guardian Books, 2000), 
Corrections and Clarifications 2002 (Atlantic Books, 2002), 
Only Correct: The Best of Corrections and Clarifications (Guardian Books, 2005), 
Journalism Right and Wrong: Ethical and Other Issues Raised by Readers in the Guardian's Open Door Column (Guardian Books, February 2007),

Selected articles
 "John Bell, The British Theatre and Samuel De Wilde", Apollo, 113 (1981), pp. 99–103.
 "Inside the cocoon" (review of Marcel Proust: Selected Letters, vol 2, 1904-1909, edited by Philip Kolb), The Guardian, 18 January 1990.
 "On an unsound footing: The readers' editor on... the role of syntax in dancing", The Guardian, 8 January 1999.
 "Black and white cases", The Guardian, 6 March 1999.
 "Abuse of trust", The Guardian, 10 June 2000.
 "Funny ha ha", The Guardian, 30 December 2000.
 "Snap decision", The Guardian, 20 January 2001.
 "Snap judgment", The Guardian, 12 January 2002.
 "Words' worth", The Guardian, 16 February 2002.
 "Matters of approximate fact", The Guardian, 21 October 2002.
 "Unspeakable but readable", The Guardian, 28 August 2004.
 Why should newspapers not be accountable?'", Open Door, The Guardian, 22 October 2017.

References

External links
Ian Mayes page at The Guardian
Readers' Editor of The Guardian includes his Open Door column archives
"Corrections and Clarifications" column in The Guardian

Ian Mayes, "Trust me, I'm an ombudsman", The British Journalism Review, Vol. 14, No. 2, 2004, pp. 65–70.
Organisation of News Ombudsmen official site
Ian Mayes, "The return of the apostrofly" (a brief history of the apostrofly), The Guardian, 4 December 2004
"Recursive link to this Wiki article on Ian Mayes" in The Guardian, 6 August 2005
"Writing wrongs: Guardian readers' editor Ian Mayes", Press Gazette, 12 January 2007.
 "Guardian readers' editor Ian Mayes talks to PG", Press Gazette, 5 January 2007.

Year of birth missing (living people)
Living people
British essayists
British newspaper editors
Ombudsmen in the United Kingdom
The Guardian journalists
Mayes,Ian